Denmark competed at the 1984 Summer Olympics in Los Angeles, United States. 60 competitors, 49 men and 11 women, took part in 33 events in 11 sports.

Medalists

Athletics

Men's Marathon
 Henrik Jørgensen — 2:15:55 (→ 19th place)
 Allan Zachariassen — 2:17:10 (→ 25th place)

Women's Marathon 
 Dorthe Rasmussen
 Final — 2:33:40 (→ 13th place)

Canoeing

Cycling

Thirteen cyclists, twelve men and one woman, represented Denmark in 1984.

Men's individual road race
 Per Pedersen — +11:46 (→ 24th place)
 Kim Eriksen — +15:30 (→ 40th place)
 Ole Byriel — did not finish (→ no ranking)
 Søren Lilholt — did not finish (→ no ranking)

Team time trial
 John Carlsen
 Kim Eriksen
 Lars Jensen
 Søren Lilholt

1000m time trial
 Claus Rasmussen

Individual pursuit
 Jørgen V. Pedersen
 Henning Larsen

Team pursuit
 Dan Frost
 Michael Markussen
 Jørgen V. Pedersen
 Brian Holm

Points race
 Michael Markussen
 Brian Holm

Women's individual road race
 Helle Sørensen — 2:13:28 (→ 7th place)

Equestrianism

Handball

Men's Team Competition
Preliminary Round (Group B)
Defeated Spain (21–16)
Defeated South Korea (31–28)
Defeated United States (19–16)
Defeated Sweden (26–19)
Lost to West Germany (18–20)
Bronze Medal Match
Lost to Romania (19–23) → Fourth place
Team Roster
Morten Stig Christensen
Anders Dahl-Nielsen
Peter Fenger
Jørgen Gluver
Hans Hattesen
Carsten Haurum
Klaus Jensen
Mogens Jeppesen
Keld Nielsen
Erik Rasmussen
Jens Roepstorff
Per Skaarup
Poul Sørensen
Mikael Strøm

Judo

Rowing

Sailing

Open

Shooting

Swimming

Men's 100m Freestyle 
Peter Rohde
 Heat — 51.40
 B-Final — 51.98 (→ 16th place)
Franz Mortensen
 Heat — 52.22 (→ did not advance, 24th place)

Men's 200m Freestyle
Franz Mortensen
 Heat — 1:54.09 (→ did not advance, 23rd place)

Men's 400m Freestyle
Franz Mortensen
 Heat — 4:11.97 (→ did not advance, 31st place)

Men's 100m Butterfly
Søren Østberg
 Heat — 55.73
 B-Final — 56.04 (→ 15th place)

Men's 200m Butterfly
Søren Østberg
 Heat — 2:06.12 (→ did not advance, 25th place)

Men's 200m Individual Medley
Peter Rohde
 Heat — 2:07.93
 B-Final — 2:07.10 (→ 13th place)

Weightlifting

References

Nations at the 1984 Summer Olympics
1984
Summer Olympics